Michael Slipchuk (born March 19, 1966) is a Canadian former competitive figure skater who currently serves as the High Performance Director of Skate Canada.

As a competitive skater, Slipchuk won the 1992 Canadian Figure Skating Championships and placed 9th at the 1992 Winter Olympics. He competed five times at the World Figure Skating Championships. His highest placement was seventh, in 1991.

Following his competitive career, Slipchuk skated for two seasons on Stars On Ice and later worked as a coach in Calgary. He was named the High Performance Director of Skate Canada on September 21, 2006.

Results

References

 Skatabase: 1980s Worlds
 Skatabase: 1990s Worlds

Navigation

1966 births
Living people
Canadian male single skaters
Olympic figure skaters of Canada
Figure skaters at the 1992 Winter Olympics
Figure skaters from Edmonton
Competitors at the 1990 Goodwill Games